Convoy QP 15 was an Arctic convoy of the PQ/QP series which ran during the Second World War. It was one of a series of convoys run to return Allied ships to home ports in the   United Kingdom from the northern ports of the Soviet Union.
It sailed in November 1942 and was the last convoy in the "QP" series. It was scattered by a storm which sank the Soviet destroyer Sokrushitelny, and was attacked by U-boats of the German Navy which sank two of the thirty merchant ships.

Ships 
The convoy initially consisted of 31 merchant ships, most of which had arrived with PQ 18. The convoy commodore was Capt. WC Meek RNR in Temple Arch.
The close escort comprised four corvettes and an ASW minesweeper. These were joined later by an ocean escort of five destroyers, and five others joined during the voyage.
The escort was supplemented by the AA cruiser Ulster Queen and the CAM ship Empire Morn. Distant cover was provided by a force of two cruisers and three destroyers, and submarine patrols were mounted off the Norwegian ports to oppose any sortie by German surface vessels.

QP 15 was opposed by a patrol line (code-named "Boreas") of ten U-boats in the Norwegian Sea, and by German air forces, though the latter were kept at bay by foul weather.

Voyage 
The convoy set out from Archangel on 17 November 1942, accompanied by the local escort of four minesweepers, and were joined the following day by two Soviet destroyers. Two ships grounded after leaving harbour, and had to be left behind. They were refloated and returned to port. 
On 20 November the convoy was joined by its ocean escort of five destroyers.
Also on 20 November a gale sprang up and scattered the convoy and damaged several ships, including the two Soviet destroyers.
The two Soviet destroyer Baku was badly damaged but managed to limp back to port. A large wave hit Sokrushitelny and tore off her stern. Three Soviet destroyers were sent to assist and manage to rescue 187 crewmen from the Sokrushitelny, which sank on 22 November.

On 23 November, the U-boat  attacked and sank the British freighter Goolistan. Later in the day,  fired a spread of torpedoes at the Soviet freighter Kuznets Lesov, one of which struck and sank her; both ships were lost with all hands.

The convoy arrived at Loch Ewe on 30 November 1942.

Ships involved

References

Bibliography
 Blair, Clay. Hitler's U-boat War Vol I. (1996) .
 Kemp, Paul. Convoy! Drama in Arctic Waters (1993) .
 R Ruegg, A Hague (1992) Convoys to Russia 

QP 15
Naval battles of World War II involving Germany
C